is a temple of the Nichiren Shū in the city of Fujisawa, Kanagawa Prefecture, Japan. It stands on the site of the former Tatsukuchi (or Tatsunokuchi) Execution Grounds, and its name uses the same two kanji meaning "dragon mouth"(). It was here that Nichiren, namesake of the Buddhist sect, was to have been executed. It was founded in 1337 by Nippō, a disciple of Nichiren.

Major buildings at the temple include the Hondō, a five-story pagoda, a stupa (sharitō), and the Shichimendō. The cave where Nichiren was confined is preserved on the grounds. A statue of him stands in the courtyard in front of the Hondō.

Ryūkō-ji is a short walk from Enoshima Station on the Enoshima Electric Railway, and from Shōnan-Enoshima Station on the Shonan Monorail.

See also 
 For an explanation of terms concerning Japanese Buddhism, Japanese Buddhist art, and Japanese Buddhist temple architecture, see the Glossary of Japanese Buddhism.

On the grounds

Sources

References

External links
 Official site 

Buddhist temples in Kanagawa Prefecture
Nichiren-shū temples